Earl Anderson may refer to:

 Earl Anderson (ice hockey) (born 1951), American ice hockey player
 Earl E. Anderson (1919–2015), American Marine Corps general
 Earl William Anderson (1897–1965), American basketball player
 Earl Anderson (lawyer) (1890–1971), American lawyer